The Manila Philharmonic Orchestra (MPO) is an all-Filipino orchestra "owned and managed by the artists." This makes the MPO unique from the other orchestras in the country, as all decisions are collectively made by orchestra members, including concert programs and choice of guest performers to mundane issues, such as rehearsals. According to MPO music director and principal conductor Rodel Colmenar, "The orchestra members do not receive a single centavo during rehearsals. We all gather together solely for the love of music. We perform because we love to play and we love to make music."

External links
Manila Philharmonic Official Website
Manila Philharmonic: an Orchestra the plays from the Heart
Violinist.com: Violinists who Played with Manila Philharmonic Orchestra
Philippine Headline News Online 

Filipino orchestras
Musical groups from Metro Manila